Snuggerud is a surname. Notable people with the surname include:

 Dave Snuggerud (born 1966), American ice hockey player
 Luc Snuggerud (born 1995), American ice hockey player
 Jimmy Snuggerud (born 2004), American ice hockey player